Dragoș Vodă is a commune in Călărași County, Muntenia, Romania. It is composed of three villages: Bogdana, Dragoș Vodă and Socoalele.

As of 2007 the population of Dragoș Vodă is 2,906.

References

Communes in Călărași County
Localities in Muntenia